Les Voix Baroques is a Canadian vocal ensemble specializing in early music. The ensemble was founded in 1999 by Matthew White (countertenor), Chloe Meyers (violinist) and Amanda Keesmaat (harpsichordist).

Discography
 Carissimi Oratorios ATMA Classique
 Canticum canticorum - motets from the Song of Songs ATMA Classique
 Humori. Venetian carnival songs and madrigals. ATMA Classique
 J.S. Bach Johannes-Passion ATMA Classique
 O Poore Distracted World! - English Songs & Anthems. Yulia Van Doren, Shannon Mercer (sopranos), Matthew White (alto), Charles Daniels (tenor), Tyler Duncan (baritone) & Robert Macdonald (bass). Les Voix Baroques, Alexander Weimann ATMA Classique

References

Early music groups